Russia participated in the ninth Winter Paralympics in Turin, Italy.

Russia entered 29 athletes in the following sports:

Alpine skiing: 3 male, 3 female
Nordic skiing: 15 male, 8 female

Medalists

See also
2006 Winter Paralympics
Russia at the 2006 Winter Olympics

External links
Torino 2006 Paralympic Games
International Paralympic Committee
 Russian Paralympic Committee

2006
Nations at the 2006 Winter Paralympics
Winter Paralympics